Amor Amarillo (Spanish for Yellow Love) is the first solo album by Argentine rock musician Gustavo Cerati, as a side-project, while he was still active in Soda Stereo, his ex-band.

Track listing 
All songs written by Gustavo Cerati, except where noted.

Personnel
 Gustavo Cerati - lead vocals, guitars, backing vocals, fretless bass guitar, MPC60, keyboards, wind instrument, effects, percussion and producer.
 Zeta Bosio - keyboards, percussion, bass on "Amor Amarillo" and producer.
 Cecilia Amenábar - vocals, backing vocals, bass on "A Merced".
 Tweety González - programming assistance and audio consultant.

Produced by Gustavo Cerati and Zeta Bosio.

Certifications

References

Gustavo Cerati albums
1994 albums
RCA Records albums